"Fever" is a song by American hard rock band Aerosmith.  It is from the band's massively successful 1993 album Get a Grip.  It was written by Steven Tyler and Joe Perry and is the only Tyler/Perry song on Get a Grip written without the aid of "song doctors".  The song is the fourth track on Get a Grip, running four minutes and 15 seconds.  The song reached #5 on the Billboard Mainstream Rock Tracks chart and is one of seven tracks from Get a Grip to make a chart appearance on any chart.

Content
The song seems to be about having a good time, and how the band members, especially Steven Tyler, have abandoned drugs in favor of sex and other enjoyable things in life, with lyrics such as "the buzz that you be gettin' from the crack don't last, I'd rather be OD'in on the crack of her ass."

The song features heavy guitar interplay by Joe Perry and Brad Whitford, a fast-paced drum beat and bass rhythm by Joey Kramer and Tom Hamilton, and loud and varied singing and harmonica playing by Tyler. The guitar solo is played by Whitford.

Chart positions (Aerosmith version)
"Fever" debuted at #25 on the U.S. Billboard Album Rock Tracks for the week of September 4, 1993

Garth Brooks version

Country music artist Garth Brooks covered the song in 1995, retitled as "The Fever".

Content
Brooks's country rock-generated version featured altered lyrics, describing a rodeo star addicted to his profession (e.g., "He's got a split finger wrap and his rope's pulled way too tight / He's got a lunatic smile 'cause he's really drawn deep tonight.") The cover was included on his album Fresh Horses. That album's second single, it peaked #23 on the U.S. Billboard Hot Country Singles & Tracks (now Hot Country Songs) chart and #2 on the RPM Top Country Tracks charts in Canada. Brooks also included the song in his live shows and it appeared on his 1998 album Double Live.

Personnel
Garth Brooks – lead and backing vocals
Mike Chapman – bass guitar
Rob Hajacos – fiddle
Gordon Kennedy – electric guitar
Chris Leuzinger – electric guitar
Milton Sledge – drums and percussion

Chart positions
"The Fever" debuted at number 27 on the U.S. Billboard Hot Country Singles & Tracks for the week of November 25, 1995.

Year-end charts

Other versions
Garth Brooks' adaptation of the song was also recorded by American country music artist Chris LeDoux on his 1998 album One Road Man.

References

1993 singles
1995 singles
1993 songs
Aerosmith songs
Garth Brooks songs
Chris LeDoux songs
Songs written by Steven Tyler
Songs written by Joe Perry (musician)
Song recordings produced by Allen Reynolds
Capitol Records Nashville singles
Song recordings produced by Bruce Fairbairn
Geffen Records singles